The 1962–63 season was the 15th season of competitive football in Israel and the 37th season under the Israeli Football Association, established in 1928, during the British Mandate.

Review and Events
 At the end of the season, the Liga Alef (second tier) was reconstructed expanding Liga Leumit, the top division, to 15 clubs and splitting into two regional divisions, each with 14 clubs. This meant that no clubs relegated from Liga Leumit, while 3 clubs promoted from Liga Alef, and 17 clubs promoted from Liga Bet To accommodate the vacant places in the two divisions of Liga Alef.

Domestic leagues

Promotion and relegation
The following promotions and relegations took place at the end of the season:

Promoted to Liga Leumit
 Hapoel Ramat Gan
 Hapoel Lod
 Maccabi Sha'arayim

Relegated from Liga Leumit
None

Promoted to Liga Alef

 Beitar Ramla
 Hapoel Acre
 Hapoel Givat Haim
 Hapoel Givatayim
 Hapoel Herzliya
 Hapoel Kfar Blum
 Hapoel Kiryat Ono
 Hapoel Marmorek
 Hapoel Nahariya

 Hapoel Nahliel
 Hapoel Rishon LeZion
 Maccabi Hadera
 Maccabi Ramat Amidar
 Maccabi Shmuel Tel Aviv
 Maccabi Zikhron Ya'akov
 SK Nes Tziona
 YMCA Jerusalem

Relegated from Liga Alef
 Hapoel Safed
 Maccabi Ramla

Promoted to Liga Bet

 Beitar Acre
 Beitar Ezra
 Beitar Kiryat Ekron
 Beitar Nahariya
 Beitar Safed
 F.C. Even Yehuda
 Hapoel Afikim
 Hapoel Avraham Be'er Sheva
 Hapoel Bnei Zion
 Hapoel Dorot

 Hapoel HaTzafon Jerusalem
 Hapoel Kfar Shalem
 Hapoel Migdal HaEmek
 Hapoel Pardesiya
 Shefa-'Amr Club
 Hapoel Shikun HaMizrah
 Hapoel Tirat HaCarmel
 Maccabi Ashkelon
 Maccabi Herzliya

* Hapoel Tel Hanan (3rd in Haifa division of Liga Gimel) merged with Hapoel HaMechonit from Liga Bet and was effectively promoted as well.

Relegated from Liga Bet
 ASA Jerusalem
 Beitar Beit Lid
 Hapoel Kiryat Gat
 Hapoel Yagur

Domestic cups

Israel State Cup
The 1962–63 Israel State Cup, which stated during the previous season, was completed during the season and finished on 27 May 1963, with the final, in which Hapoel Haifa had beaten its city rivals 1–0.

Israel Super Cup
On 22 January 1963, league champions Hapoel Petah Tikva and cup holders Maccabi Haifa met in a contest for the second Super Cup. The cup, which wasn't sanctioned by the IFA, was donated by Ilanshil-Polio, an Israeli organization dedicated to aid Poliomyelitis victims, with proceedings going towards the organization. The match ended in 2–2 draw and the cup was shared.

National Teams

National team

1962–63 matches

References

   
Seasons in Israeli football